Sun Xiangdong is a major general in the People's Liberation Army of China.

He is a representative of the 20th National Congress of the Chinese Communist Party and an alternate member of the 20th Central Committee of the Chinese Communist Party.

Biography
A native of Anlu County, Hubei, Sun served in the Airborne Troop of the People's Liberation Army for a long time. In 2019, he was appointed leader of 95829 Airborne Troop of the People's Liberation Army.

References

Living people
People from Xiaogan
People's Liberation Army generals from Hubei
People's Republic of China politicians from Hubei
Chinese Communist Party politicians from Hubei
Alternate members of the 20th Central Committee of the Chinese Communist Party
Year of birth missing (living people)